H. L. "Ike" Poole (October 10, 1915 – June 24, 2002) was an All-American basketball player at the University of Arkansas.  Hailing from McGehee, Arkansas, Poole lettered three years in football, track and basketball at Arkansas.  During his time in Fayetteville, Poole led the Razorbacks to two Southwest Conference titles and was twice named first team All-Conference.  As a senior in 1936, Poole was named a consensus All-American and was an alternate on the 1936 Olympic basketball team.

Poole was inducted into the Arkansas Razorbacks Hall of Honor in 1998.  In 1994, he was inducted into the Arkansas Sports Hall of Fame.

References

1915 births
2002 deaths
All-American college men's basketball players
Arkansas Razorbacks football players
Arkansas Razorbacks men's basketball players
Arkansas Razorbacks men's track and field athletes
Basketball players from Arkansas
Forwards (basketball)
People from McGehee, Arkansas
American men's basketball players